Ice hockey at the 2012 Winter Youth Olympics was held at the Tyrolean Ice Arena in Innsbruck, Austria from 13 to 22 January. The difference between the Youth Olympic program for ice hockey and the Winter Olympics was the addition of a skill challenge for each gender.

Medal summary

Medal table

Events

Qualification system
There were ten teams total (five per gender), with 17 players on each team. The host nation was allowed one team of each gender. The remaining eight teams were selected based on their joint Men’s and Women’s 2011 IIHF World Ranking.

For the skills challenge, the host nation was allowed one competitor of each sex. For the remaining competitors, national competitions were held, and the qualifiers attended a Global Skills Challenge at the 2011 Hockey Development Camp in Vierumäki, Finland.

For the boys tournament, athletes born in 1996 are permitted to compete, for the girls its 1994.

The IIHF announced the teams on September 23.

Boys

Girls

Skills challenge
The following athletes have qualified: Originally 16 athletes from each gender were to compete, but the girls' competition will have only 15 while the boys' competition will have 16.

References

 
2012
2012 in ice hockey
2012 Winter Youth Olympics events
2012